Aljoscha Andreas Long  is a German writer, psychologist, philosopher, composer and martial arts teacher.

Aljoscha Long studied psychology in Toronto, Canada, philosophy and linguistics in Munich, Germany. He has been teaching cognitive psychology in Munich and Minneapolis and neuropsychology in Nanning, China. Currently he lives in Munich, where he teaches martial arts and works as a composer and writer. He is a member of Mensa.

Most of his books are written in cooperation with his schoolmate, Ronald Schweppe, a musician, meditation teacher, writer and founder of the Munich Chamber Opera.
 
In 2012 he married the Chinese writer, teacher and healer Long Fei (龙飞).

According to Long and Schweppe's Homepage, their books have been translated in more than 16 languages, among them Italian, Spanish, Dutch, Norwegian, Korean and Chinese.

Works 
 Der Kaufmann und der Rinpoche. Diederichs, 
 Wenn du geliebt werden willst, dann liebe. Integral, 
 Das Licht des Himmels in dir. Kösel, 
 Füttere den weißen Wolf. Kösel, 
 Bao, der weise Panda, und das Geheimnis der Gelassenheit. Lotos,  
 Gelassenheit für Anfänger. GU, 
 Praxisbuch NLP: Die eigenen Kräfte aktivieren und sich auf Erfolg programmieren. Südwest, 
 Meditation: Techniken für innere Ruhe & Entspannung. BLV, 
 Gib alles, was du hast – und du bekommst alles, was du willst. Gabal, 
 NLP macht Kinder stark. Südwest, 
 Nicht anstrengen – leben! Das Dao des Alltags. Heyne, 
 Karma. Die Gebrauchsanleitung. Lotos, 
 Endlich frei von Angst, Gräfe & Unzer, 
 Anleitung zum Philosophieren. Herbig, 
 Die 7 Geheimnisse der Schildkröte. Lotos, 
 Mein Seelentherapeut. Gütersloher, 
 Spring über den Horizont. 77 Philosophische Spiele für Herz und Verstand. Kreuz, 
 Der Träumer, der Weise, das Innere Kind. Personale Integration. Kösel,

External links 
 
 Website of Long & Schweppe
 Author's Random House page

References 

Living people
Writers from Bonn
German women writers
1961 births
German psychologists